Pertusio is a comune (municipality) in the Metropolitan City of Turin in the Italian region Piedmont, located about 30 km north of Turin. As of 31 December 2004, it had a population of 736 and an area of 4.0 km².

Pertusio borders the following municipalities: Valperga, Prascorsano, Rivara, and San Ponso.

Demographic evolution

References

Cities and towns in Piedmont